Rachael Alexis Adams (born June 3, 1990) is an American former professional volleyball player who played as a middle blocker for the United States women's national volleyball team. Adams won gold with the national team at the 2014 World Championship and bronze at the 2016 Rio Olympic Games.

Career
She attended Mount Notre Dame High School in Cincinnati, Ohio where she played volleyball. She then played college volleyball at University of Texas at Austin. In 2012, while at Texas, Adams was named as one of the four finalists for the Honda Sports Award in volleyball.

Adams was part of the USA national team that won the 2014 World Championship gold medal when the team defeated China 3-1 in the final match.

Adams was awarded among the Best Middle Blockers along with the Brazilian Thaísa Menezes during the 2016 World Grand Prix.

With her team Eczacıbaşı VitrA, she won the gold medal at the 2016 FIVB Volleyball Women's Club World Championship.

Adams won the 2016–17 CEV Champions League bronze medal with Eczacıbaşı VitrA when her team defeated the Russian Dinamo Moscow 3-0 and she was also awarded Best Middle Blocker. At the end of season 2017-2018 she signed for Italian club Monza and will play in Italian A1 league.

Awards

Individual
 2013 Nominee Honda Sports Award for volleyball
2016 World Grand Prix "Best Middle Blocker"
 2016-17 CEV Champions League "Best Middle Blocker"

Clubs
 2016–17 CEV Champions League -  Bronze Medal, with Eczacıbaşı VitrA

National team
 2013  Pan-American Volleyball Cup 	
 2013  NORCECA Championship 	
 2013  FIVB World Grand Champions Cup	
 2014  FIVB World Championship 	
 2015  FIVB World Grand Prix	
 2016  FIVB World Grand Prix
 2016  Summer Olympics

References

External links
Adams' official bio at USA Volleyball
Texas Longhorns bio

1990 births
Living people
American women's volleyball players
American expatriate sportspeople in Turkey
Sportspeople from Cincinnati
Texas Longhorns women's volleyball players
Volleyball players at the 2015 Pan American Games
Pan American Games gold medalists for the United States
Olympic bronze medalists for the United States in volleyball
Medalists at the 2016 Summer Olympics
Volleyball players at the 2016 Summer Olympics
Pan American Games medalists in volleyball
Expatriate volleyball players in Italy
Middle blockers
American expatriate sportspeople in Italy
Expatriate volleyball players in Turkey
African-American volleyball players
Aydın Büyükşehir Belediyespor volleyballers
Medalists at the 2015 Pan American Games
21st-century African-American sportspeople
21st-century African-American women